Thomas Joseph Shaughnessy (July 12, 1892 – September 21, 1938) was an American ice hockey player and coach. Shaughnessy was head coach of the Chicago Black Hawks for most of the 1929–30 Black Hawks season. He resigned on January 16, 1930 to go into law practice.

He was an alumnus of the University of Notre Dame (1915), where he played football under coach Knute Rockne. In September 1938, Shaughnessy died of a heart attack, aged 46.

Coaching record

References

External links

1892 births
1938 deaths
American ice hockey coaches
Chicago Blackhawks coaches